Gong Pusheng (September 1913 – 4 August 2007), also known as Kung Pu-sheng  was a Chinese female diplomat.

Biography
Gong Pusheng was born in September 1913 in Shanghai. Her family was from  Hefei city, Anhui Province.  Her father Gong Zhenzhou held several positions in the Sun Yat-sen’s government.  In Shanghai she studied at St. Mary 's Episcopalian Girls' School, and continued her higher education at Yenching University.

She joined the Chinese Communist Party in 1938. On the advice of Zhou Enlai, she later joined the Columbia University. In USA she established contacts with a number of prominent people, including Eleanor Roosevelt, Pearl Buck, and Paul Robeson.

In 1948 she became a member of the Human Rights Committee at the League of Nations in New York. She was appointed as a deputy director in the Foreign Ministry, in charge of International Organization and Conference Department in 1949. She later became director in the same department in 1958. She became the first Chinese ambassador to Ireland in August 1980.She was part of a number of Chinese delegations to international conferences, and undertook extensive visits abroad.

In 1949 she married Zhang Hanfu (1905 – 1972), who was also a senior diplomat. Her sister Gong Peng also served in the Foreign Ministry.

She died in Beijing on 4 August 2007.

References

1913 births
2007 deaths
Chinese diplomats
Ambassadors of China to Ireland
League of Nations people